Kelvyn Ajuluchukwu Igwe (born 26 March 1987 in Enugu) is a former Nigerian footballer who played as defender.

Club career 
He started career in Polonia Warsaw. He made a debut for this club on 23 September 2005 in away local derby match between Legia Warsaw. He played 9 matches for this club and after that, he moved to HB Køge in January 2006. In Poland, he hasn't been paid for play because he was deceived by manager from Poland. In August 2006 he was loaned to FC Hjørring. He left this club on 23 January 2007 and a week later he was loaned to Lolland-Falster Alliancen. In July 2007 he returned to HB Køge. In March 2008 he suffered knee injury. In autumn 2012 he was a player of Mqabba FC. In 2013, he came back to Poland and he signed Drukarz Warszawa.

References

Bibliography

External links 
 

1987 births
Living people
Nigerian footballers
Nigerian expatriate footballers
Ekstraklasa players
Polonia Warsaw players
HB Køge players
Mqabba F.C. players
Expatriate footballers in Poland
Expatriate men's footballers in Denmark
Association football defenders
Footballers from Enugu